KOTS (1230 AM) is a radio station licensed to serve Deming, New Mexico, United States. The station is owned by Luna County Broadcasting Co.

KOTS broadcasts a country music format, including news programming from AP Radio. "
All country superstars are heard on KOTS, including classic country artists often overlooked by other stations, and Cowboy-Western music of cowboys and cowgirls, past and present."

References

External links

OTS
Country radio stations in the United States
Luna County, New Mexico